Silvan Kindle (born 10 July 1936) is a Liechtensteiner former alpine skier who competed in the 1960 Winter Olympics.

References

External links
 

1936 births
Living people
Liechtenstein male alpine skiers
Olympic alpine skiers of Liechtenstein
Alpine skiers at the 1960 Winter Olympics